Boteler is a surname. Notable people with the surname include:

Alexander Boteler (1815–1892), 19th-century American politician and clerk from Virginia
Arnold le Boteler, late-11th- and early-12th-century Norman squire with a penchant for property development
Henry Boteler (disambiguation)
John Boteler, 1st Baron Boteler of Brantfield (1565–1647), English politician, MP from 1625 to 1626
John Boteler Parker (1786–1851), British Army general
Joseph C. Boteler III, American politician elected in 2002 to represent District 8 of the Maryland House of Delegates in Baltimore County
Philip Boteler (disambiguation)
Ralph Boteler, 1st Baron Sudeley (1394–1473), Captain of Calais and Treasurer of England (from 7 July 1443)
Samuel Boteler Bristowe QC (1822–1897), English barrister and Liberal Party politician from Nottinghamshire
Wade Boteler (1888–1943), American film actor
William Boteler (fl. 1640s and 1650s), Roundhead and one of the major-generals during the Rule of the Major Generals
William Boteler (disambiguation)

See also
Baron Boteler (sometimes modernly Baron Butler or Baron Botiler), a title that has been created three times in the Peerage of England
Boteler baronets created for persons with the surname Boteler, all in the Baronetage of England
Sir Thomas Boteler Church of England High School, comprehensive school in Warrington